While Kerr is traditionally a Scottish surname, it is also used as an English language given name. People with the given name Kerr include:

Kerr Avon, fictional character from Blakes 7
Kerr Eby (1890–1946), American illustrator
Kerr Grant (1878–1967), Australian physicist
Kerr Kriisa (born 2001), Estonian basketball player
Kerr Neilson, Australian funds manager
W. Kerr Scott (1896–1958), North Carolina governor and US senator
Kerr Smith (born 1972), American actor

See also 
Clan Kerr, origins of the name
Kerr (surname)

Given names
Masculine given names
Scottish given names
English given names